Brook Farm School was a state run 'special' boarding school in the village of Tarporley in the English county of Cheshire.

It opened in 1975 and closed Aug. 31, 2001.  The school catered for both residential and day pupils with emotional and behavioural difficulties.

The site stood empty for a while although there were  plans to demolish it to make way for a new Primary school.

From March 2006 - 2011 the school was leased to The Storehouse Church.

In May 2013 the school was demolished to make way for a housing estate.

References

External links 
 Village website
 Article discussing closure of the school
 Storehouse Church homepage

Defunct schools in Cheshire West and Chester
Educational institutions established in 1975
1975 establishments in England
Educational institutions disestablished in 2001
2001 disestablishments in England
Demolished buildings and structures in England
Buildings and structures demolished in 2013
Defunct special schools in England
Tarporley